Wong Uk Tsuen is a village in the Yuen Long Kau Hui area of Yuen Long District, Hong Kong.

Administration
Wong Uk Tsuen is a recognized village under the New Territories Small House Policy. For electoral purposes, Wong Uk Tsuen is located in the Shap Pat Heung North constituency of the Yuen Long District Council. It is currently represented by Shum Ho-kit, who was elected in the 2019 elections.

History
Wong Uk Tsuen is part of the Tung Tau alliance or "Joint Meeting Group of Seven Villages", together with Nam Pin Wai, Tung Tau Tsuen, Choi Uk Tsuen, Ying Lung Wai, Shan Pui Tsuen and Tai Wai Tsuen. The Yi Shing Temple in Wong Uk Tsuen is an alliance temple of the Tung Tau Alliance.

On 8 September 2021, 58 bullets were seized inside of a house in the village.

References

External links

 Delineation of area of existing village Wong Uk Tsuen (Shap Pat Heung) for election of resident representative (2019 to 2022)

Villages in Yuen Long District, Hong Kong
Yuen Long
Shap Pat Heung